The surname Lambertini may refer to:

The Blessed Imelda Lambertini (1322–May 12, 1333), patroness of First Holy Communicants

175629 Lambertini, a minor planet discovered in 2007 by F. Tozzi and M. Graziani
Prospero Lambertini (1675–1758), Italian Cardinal elected Pope under the name Benedict XIV
Attilio Lambertini (1920–2002), Italian racing cyclist
Egano Righi-Lambertini (1906–2000), Italian Roman Catholic cardinal and Vatican diplomatic 
Marta Lambertini (1937-2019), Argentine composer
Michele di Matteo Lambertini (active 1447–1469), Italian painter active in Bologna

Italian-language surnames
Patronymic surnames
Surnames from given names